Bella Donna Boudreaux is the name of a fictional character appearing in American comic books published by Marvel Comics. The character is commonly associated with the X-Man Gambit. She first appeared in X-Men (vol. 2) #8, and was created by Jim Lee and Scott Lobdell.

Publication history
Belladonna plays a major role in the first Rogue mini-series.

Fictional character biography
Young street-thief Remy LeBeau met Bella Donna Boudreaux when they were only children, and the pair soon became friends. Unbeknownst to them both, they came from rival Guilds (those of Thieves and Assassins, respectively). As they grew up and the rivalry between the Guilds increased, their fathers arranged for a marriage between the two in the hopes that it would unite the Guilds. Immediately after the wedding, Bella Donna's brother, Julien, lashed out in jealousy and challenged Remy in a fight to the death. Remy won, killing Julien, and as  punishment, he was exiled from New Orleans. Choosing to make his own choices in life from that point on, he abandoned Bella Donna.

A few years later, Bella Donna sought out Gambit to help fend off the Brood, who were attacking the Guilds. Having persuaded Gambit and the X-Men to come back to New Orleans, they battled the new enemy with the aid of Dan Ketch, the second Ghost Rider. Using her new psychic powers, Bella Donna followed Psylocke into the astral plane and expended her energy, before collapsing in Gambit's arms. Believing her dead, he told the Thieves Guild to take care of her, and went off for revenge against the Brood.

As it happened, Bella Donna was not actually dead, but merely in a coma. Gambit risked his life to bring her Candra's Elixir of Life. In the meantime, although she was catatonic, she accidentally touched Rogue and lost her memories. She woke up without any recollection of who she was, or who Remy was, and was taken away by her father.

Bella Donna's memory slowly returned, and she felt as if her soul had been violated. Enraged and manipulated by Candra, she had Rogue's comatose old boyfriend Cody kidnapped. This led to Rogue trying to rescue Cody in Louisiana. Eventually, Cody loses his life in the fight between Rogue and Candra.

Gambit returned again to New Orleans, ignorant to the multiple hits put up against him in the meantime. Bella Donna herself had taken one of the contracts, though she had no intention of killing him. Instead, she arranged it so that she could meet with him and sort out the conflicting emotions she had about him. After he was elected Viceroy of the Unified Guilds of New Orleans he passed power on to her, and returned to the X-Men. She now rules in his absence, still in love with him.

She briefly entered a relationship with Bandit, a former New Warriors member, eerily reminiscent of Gambit, but Gambit subsequently revealed he was manipulating her.

It has yet to be revealed whether Bella Donna has retained her mutant powers after the events of M-Day.

Bella Donna reappeared, still leading the Assassin's Guild. She dispatches a group of super-villain assassins after Domino.

Much later, she clashes with Kaine who takes on the Scarlet Spider identity.

After hearing of Remy and Anna-Marie's wedding, Bella paid her ex-fiance a quick visit at the newlywed's humble abode right when the Thieves Guild comes crashing into it. Gambit's old flame came to warn him that none in the guilds are all too happy with whom he married and now his subordinates are gunning for both his crown and his head. She would opt to keep the sharks in her den off of his back as long as she could, but could make no guarantees due to their rival sects history before bidding farewell.

Ms. Bordeaux would next turn up in the service of Candra once more as she proposed to unite the Thieves & Assassins Guilds in wake of Nate Grey's devastation of the X-Men and the mutant population. But found herself on the receiving end of her reborn patron's treachery once again when the External offered a choice between her and Rogue as a sacrifice in exchange for power or exile. Gambit would choose neither however and instead opted to free his new wife while working out a new deal between his clan and their mortal enemies while putting his adopted father; Jean-Luc LeBeau in as a regent whom oversees and reports back to him while returning leadership of the assassins back to Bella Donna. Who escorts the scheming patron of her clansmen away while joking of sending the now infantile manipulator to school if she does not behave.

In other media
Bella Donna appears in the X-Men animated series, first as an image from Gambit's past in season 1, and fully in the episode "X-Ternally Yours", where she blackmails Gambit to come to her.
Bella Donna was slated to appear in the 20th Century Fox film Gambit, as the love interest of the eponymous protagonist. While initial reports suggested Lizzy Caplan was meant to play the character, it was revealed in May 2022 that Lea Seydoux was ultimately to be cast in the role. The film was eventually cancelled alongside other Fox-Marvel productions following Disney's acquisition of 21st Century Fox.

References

External links
https://web.archive.org/web/20080504062530/http://www.mutanthigh.com/belladonna.html
Bella Donna Doudreaux at Marvel.com

Fictional assassins in comics
Fictional female assassins
Fictional Cajuns
Fictional characters from Boston
Fictional characters from New Orleans
Fictional characters with energy-manipulation abilities
Fictional murderers
Marvel Comics mutants
Marvel Comics female supervillains
Characters created by Scott Lobdell
Characters created by Jim Lee
Characters created by Roger Stern
Comics characters introduced in 1992